Liberal–Labour (often referred to as "Lib-Lab") was a political association in New Zealand in the last decade of the nineteenth and first half of the twentieth centuries.

History
Initially, Liberal–Labour candidates were usually members of the Liberal Party who received Labour movement endorsement and/or advocated on behalf of labourers and trade unions in parliament. This was mainly a result of the early unionists being mostly anti-political. In 1890 there was a "Lib-Lab" alliance where Liberals and Labour sympathizers co-operated with each other. The two agreed on candidates who ran on combined tickets in several electorates. Equally, in others where only one was running against a government member, supporters of both backed each other's candidates. Most Liberal-Labour support initially came from the South Island; prior to 1905, only one MP considered to be Liberal-Labour (John Hutcheson) came from a North Island seat.

When the Liberal Party won power in 1890, five members of John Ballance's caucus claimed to be "Labour" MPs. They claimed to be from a Labour "party", though it was mostly regarded that they were merely the Labour "faction" of the Liberals. In the 1893 election they were joined by two more Liberals identifying as representing Labour interests. However, in 1896 three of the Labour members were defeated and the remaining Labour aligned Liberals merged more definitely with the other Liberals. The Liberals attempted to strengthen their support base with unionists by creating the Liberal-Labour Federation in 1899 hoping to attract formal trade union support. Many electoral alliances were formed between the Liberals and Labour particularly during second ballots in the 1908 and 1911 elections.

During the period 1904–13 there was increasing debate by unionists on the issue to separate themselves from the Liberals, which ultimately led to the creation of the present-day Labour Party in 1916.

Notable Liberal-Labour MPs

Notes

References

Politics of New Zealand
Defunct political parties in New Zealand
New Zealand Liberal Party
New Zealand Labour Party
Political parties established in the 1890s
1890s establishments in New Zealand
Political parties disestablished in the 1910s
1910s disestablishments in New Zealand
Political terminology in New Zealand